William Pearson may refer to:

 William Pearson (astronomer) (1767–1847), English astronomer who helped found the Royal Astronomical Society
 William Pearson (baritone) (1934–1995), American singer
 William Pearson (cricketer) (1912–1987), Australian cricketer
 William Pearson (priest) (1662–1715), Archdeacon of Nottingham
 William Pearson (scientist), professor of biochemistry and molecular genetics in the School of Medicine at the University of Virginia
 William Pearson (surveyor) (1829–1905), surveyor in South Australia
 William Pearson (swimmer) (1916–2004), English swimmer
 William Pearson (trade unionist) (1896–1956), Scottish trade unionist and communist activist
 William Pearson (New Hampshire politician), member of the New Hampshire House of Representatives
 William Pearson Sr. (1818–1893), member of Victorian Legislative Assembly and Council, racehorse owner
 William Pearson Jr. (1864–1919), son of the above, member of the Victorian Legislative Council
 William Fisher Pearson (1854–1888), New Zealand politician
 William Gaston Pearson (1858–1947), African American educator and businessman
 William Henry Pearson (1849–1923), English botanist
 William Pearson (baritone) (1934–1995), American baritone
 William Pearson (British politician) (1882–1963), British Member of Parliament for Jarrow
 William W. Pearson (1881–1923), British teacher, secretary of Rabindranath Tagore

See also
 Bill Pearson (disambiguation)
 Billy Pearson (1920–2002), jockey
 Billy Pearson (footballer) (1921–2009), football winger for Chester City
 Will Pearson (born 1983), co-founder of mental floss, an American magazine